Andreas Bauer (born 26 September 1982) is a former Samoa international rugby league footballer who last played for Whitehaven. Standing 180 cm and weighing 92 kg, he plays in the  position. He has also played for Hull Kingston Rovers.

Background
Bauer was born in Auckland, New Zealand.

Career
He played for the New Lynn Stags, and for Bartercard Cup side Mt Albert Lions.

In 2005 he represented New Zealand Universities at the Student World Cup which they won. He attended the University of Auckland.

Bauer is of Samoan heritage.

References

External links
Doncaster profile

1982 births
Living people
Doncaster R.L.F.C. players
Expatriate rugby league players in England
Hull Kingston Rovers players
Mount Albert Lions players
New Lynn Stags players
New Zealand expatriate rugby league players
New Zealand expatriate sportspeople in England
New Zealand sportspeople of Samoan descent
New Zealand rugby league players
Rugby league centres
Rugby league players from Auckland
Samoa national rugby league team players
University of Auckland alumni
Whitehaven R.L.F.C. players